Budd is the first release by the Chicago noise rock band Rapeman. The first three songs on the EP were recorded live. The title is a reference to Budd Dwyer, a politician who committed suicide during a televised press conference. The lyrics of the title track contain references to phrases used during the incident.

It has been re-released as bonus tracks at the end of Two Nuns and a Pack Mule, the band's only LP.

Studio versions of the first three tracks were originally planned to be used, but the band later decided in favour of live versions. The demo tracks are currently available in trading circles.

Pitchfork ranked it 6th on their list of "Steve Albini's 10 Best Records", writing that what made the title track "all the more harrowing, not to mention innovative, is the vast amount of empty spaces and granular surfaces [...] [worked] into the near-eight-minute song. It’s a brooding, abstract dynamic that would set the tone for much of ‘90s post-rock, from Slint to June of 44."

Track listing 
 "Budd" - 7:29
 "Superpussy" - 2:12
 "Log Bass" - 2:23
 "Dutch Courage" - 2:40

Personnel 
 Rey Washam – drums
 David Wm. Sims – bass
 Steve Albini – guitar, vocals
 Timothy R. Powell – recording engineer (1, 2, 3)
 Iain Burgess – recording engineer (4)

References

External links
 Touch & Go Records page on the album

Albums produced by Steve Albini
1988 debut EPs
Au Go Go Records EPs
Blast First EPs
R. Budd Dwyer
Rapeman albums
Touch and Go Records EPs